The Big Shakedown is a 1934 American pre-Code drama film starring Charles Farrell and Bette Davis, and directed by John Francis Dillon. The screenplay is based on the story "Cut Rate" by Niven Busch and Samuel G. Engel. The film also stars Ricardo Cortez and Glenda Farrell and was director John Francis Dillon's final film.

Plot
Jimmy Morrell (Charles Farrell) and Norma Nelson (Bette Davis) who plan to wed as soon as their neighborhood pharmacy begins to show a profit. The opportunity arises when former bootlegger Dutch Barnes (Ricardo Cortez) offers Jimmy a job duplicating name brand toothpaste and cosmetics that can be made cheaply and then sold in the bottles and jars of reputable pharmaceutical companies at regular prices. When Dutch asks him to copy the formula for a popular brand of antiseptic, Jimmy refuses, claiming he's unable to get a key ingredient, but when Dutch offers him a bonus hefty enough to allow Jimmy to marry Norma, he agrees.

Dutch's ex-girlfriend Lily Duran (Glenda Farrell) jealous over his attentions to another woman, notifies the antiseptic company about the deception, and is murdered by Dutch. Without their key witness, the company is forced to drop their lawsuit against Jimmy. Now beholden to Dutch, he is forced to make fake digitalis drug. Norma is given some of the drug during childbirth, causing her to lose the baby.

Jimmy seeks vengeance against Dutch, but before he can achieve his goal Sheffner, who formulated the antiseptic Jimmy manufactured, shoots Dutch. Jimmy confesses everything to the district attorney and is exonerated, allowing him and Norma to return to life as they once knew it.

Cast
Charles Farrell as Jimmy Morrell 
Bette Davis as Norma Nelson 
Ricardo Cortez as Dutch Barnes 
Glenda Farrell as Lily Duran 
Allen Jenkins as Lefty 
Henry O'Neill as Sheffner
Dewey Robinson as Slim
John Wray as Higgins
Adrian Morris as Trigger

Reception
The New York Times said, "[The picture's] particular virtue . . . is that it is specific and believable in its description of the felonious behavior involved in the racket. Thus it maintains a moderate sum of interest and excitement in the face of a routine assortment of gang-film impedimenta." TV Guide calls it an "overblown crime melodrama" and adds, "the material stretches believability at every plot turn."

References

External links

 

1934 films
American black-and-white films
1934 crime drama films
American crime drama films
Warner Bros. films
Films directed by John Francis Dillon
Films produced by Samuel Bischoff
1930s English-language films
1930s American films